, is a Japanese actor who is known to be featured in films that involve much martial arts. He trained in Muay Thai, Karate and Boxing before starting his acting career.

Best known for his portrayals as Kyosuke Akiba in Godzilla: Tokyo S.O.S., Shinjiro Hayashida from Cromartie High - The Movie, and Tetsuki Yamato/Kamen Rider Ketaros in the 2006 Tokusatsu movie, Kamen Rider Kabuto: God Speed Love.

He was also featured as a main character in the film adaptation of Futaro Yamada's novel Koga Ninpocho, Shinobi: Heart Under Blade, And was a part of the stunt performers for The Last Samurai. He also recently made a minor/cameo role in The Fast and the Furious: Tokyo Drift as a Yakuza bodyguard.

Filmography

Films

Godzilla: Tokyo SOS (2003) – Kyosuke Akiba
Cromartie High: The Movie (2005) – Hayashida Shinjiro
Shinobi: Heart Under Blade (2005) – Chikuma Koshiro
Kamen Rider Kabuto: God Speed Love (2006) – Tetsuki Yamato/Kamen Rider Ketaros
The Fast and the Furious: Tokyo Drift (2006) – Yakuza bodyguard
Nu-Meri: Book of the New Spawn (2008) 
Ultraman Ginga (2013) - Gō Ōsato
Bushido Man (2013) - Takanori Tsujimoto
Live (2014)

References

External links
Official website
interview
 
 

1975 births
Living people
Kamen Rider
Koga, Mitsuki
Japanese male boxers
Japanese male karateka
Japanese Muay Thai practitioners
People from Aizuwakamatsu